Recurvaria kittella is a moth of the family Gelechiidae. It is found in the West Indies, where it has been recorded from Haiti and Puerto Rico.

The wingspan is about 7 mm. The forewings are cream-white, with a small black costal spot at the base, a broad black transverse fascia before the middle, 
slightly attenuated at its centre, and a triangular black costal spot halfway between the fascia and the apex, this is preceded by a small black spot on the dorsum and followed by a few black scales on the termen below the apex. The hindwings are shining, very pale grey.

References

Moths described in 1897
Recurvaria
Moths of the Caribbean